The Hellenic Navy General Staff is the general staff of the Hellenic Navy, the naval component of the Greek Armed Forces. It is headed by the Chief of the Navy General Staff, currently Vice Admiral Stylianos Petrakis.

History 
The Hellenic Navy General Staff was established by law on 21 July 1907 and organized by Royal Decree on 12 November of the same year. It ceased to function following the German invasion of Greece in April 1941, and was reconstituted following Liberation in September 1944. During the intervening period, the Royal Hellenic Navy, although run by the Greek government in exile, was subordinated operationally to the British Admiralty. When the Hellenic National Defence General Staff was established in 1950, the HNGS was subordinated to it. During the Cold War, the Chief of the HNGS also fulfilled the duties of NATO Commander Eastern Mediterranean (COMEDEAST).

Command Structure 
 Chief of the Navy General Staff (Αρχηγός ΓΕΝ, Α/ΓΕΝ), the head of the Navy
 Deputy Chief of the Navy General Staff (Υπαρχηγός ΓΕΝ), who functions as the chief of staff and runs its day-to-day affairs
 General Inspector of the Navy (Γενικός Επιθεωρητής ΠΝ), subordinated directly to the Chief of the HNGS
 Director of Financial Inspection of the Navy (Διευθυντής Οικονομικού Ελέγχου ΠΝ)

External links 
 Hellenic Navy General Staff 

Naval units and formations of Greece
Staff (military)